This is a summary of 1999 in music in the United Kingdom.

Events
January - The film Hilary and Jackie, starring Emily Watson and James Frain as Jacqueline du Pré and Daniel Barenboim, is released.
3 January – Steps score their first number one in the UK singles chart with "Heartbeat / Tragedy".
7 January
After eight years of marriage, Rod Stewart and his wife Rachel Hunter announce they are separating.
Paul McCartney is present at his daughter Heather's latest launch event in Georgia, United States.
10 February – Iron Maiden announces that singer Bruce Dickinson and guitarist Adrian Smith have rejoined the band, while lead singer Blaze Bayley has left. This means the band now has three lead guitarists.
14 February – Elton John appears as himself in a special episode of the animated series The Simpsons
21 March – Irish girl group B*Witched score a fourth consecutive number one in the UK singles chart with Blame It On The Weatherman, thus becoming the first band to have all their first four singles enter at the top and setting a new record that would be broken a year later by Westlife.
10 April – A charity tribute, the Concert for Linda McCartney is held at the Royal Albert Hall in London, hosted by Eddie Izzard, with proceeds going to animal rights causes. Performers include Paul McCartney, Chrissie Hynde, Elvis Costello, Sinéad O'Connor, and Tom Jones.
28 April - The Verve split for the 2nd time.  And frontman Richard Ashcroft launches a solo career.
27 May – The British Academy of Songwriters, Composers and Authors establishes its new fellowship, the first recipient being Martin Gore.
7 June – S Club 7 releases their debut single "Bring It All Back", which goes straight to number one in the UK singles chart.
28 August – Former Dexys Midnight Runners frontman Kevin Rowland is bottled offstage at the Reading Festival, which saw him perform "The Greatest Love Of All" whilst wearing a white dress.
21 September – David Bowie releases Hours, his twenty-first studio album and the first by a major artist to be made legally available as an electronic download.
12 November – At Bristol Crown Court, former glam rock star Gary Glitter is jailed for four months for downloading child pornography.
December – Alan McGee announces the dissolution of Creation Records after 16 years.  The final release for the label would be Primal Scream's album "XTRMNTR", released in January 2000.
30 December – George Harrison and his wife Olivia fight off a knife attack by an intruder in his Friar Park home.

Classical works
Arthur Butterworth – Bubu for English horn, viola and harp, Op. 107 
Alun Hoddinott – Symphony No. 10
Joe Jackson – Symphony No. 1
Julian Stewart Lindsay – Vox Dei
Roger Smalley – Crepuscule, for piano quartet
Raymond Yiu – Tranced

Opera
David Blake – Scoring A Century
Jonathan Dove – Tobias and the Angel

Musical theatre
6 April – Mamma Mia!, with book by Catherine Johnson and songs by Björn Ulvaeus and Benny Andersson, opens at the Prince Edward Theatre. It would later transfer to the Prince of Wales Theatre on 9 June 2004, continuing its run until September 2012, when it moved to the Novello Theatre.

Musical films
Topsy-Turvy, starring Allan Corduner as Sir Arthur Sullivan and Jim Broadbent as W. S. Gilbert

Film scores and incidental music

Film
Michael Nyman – Wonderland
Rachel Portman – The Cider House Rules

Television
Murray Gold – Queer as Folk

Music awards

BRIT Awards
The 1999 BRIT Awards winners were:

Best soundtrack: "Titanic"
British album: Manic Street Preachers – "This Is My Truth Tell Me Yours"
British breakthrough act: Belle & Sebastian
British dance act: Fatboy Slim
British female solo artist: Des'ree
British group: Manic Street Preachers
British male solo artist: Robbie Williams
British single: Robbie Williams – "Angels"
British video: Robbie Williams – "Millennium"
International breakthrough act: Natalie Imbruglia
International female: Natalie Imbruglia
International group: The Corrs
International male: Beck
Outstanding contribution: Eurythmics

Mercury Music Prize
The 1999 Mercury Music Prize was awarded to Talvin Singh – Ok.

Record of the Year
The Record of the Year was awarded to "Flying Without Wings" by Westlife.

Births
28 January – Hrvy, singer
April – S1mba, rapper
4 April – Sheku Kanneh-Mason, award-winning cellist
9 December – Aitch, rapper

Deaths
14 January – Bryn Jones, British ethnic electronica and experimental musician, 37 (infection)
23 February – Ruth Gipps, composer, oboist, pianist and impresario, 78
2 March – Dusty Springfield, singer, 59 (breast cancer)
 21 March – Ernie Wise, entertainer, 73
3 April – Lionel Bart, songwriter, 68 (cancer)
14 April – Anthony Newley, songwriter, actor and singer, 67
19 May – James Blades, orchestral percussionist, 97
16 June – Screaming Lord Sutch, pop musician and politician, 58
12 July – Bill Owen, actor and songwriter, 85 (pancreatic cancer)
2 August – Eric Hope, pianist, 84
17 September – Frankie Vaughan, singer, 71 (heart failure)
1 October – Lena Zavaroni, singer, 35 (pneumonia)
7 October – Deryck Guyler, actor and washboard player, 85
15 October – Josef Locke, tenor, 82
21 October – Queenie Ashton, singer and actress, 96
31 October – Howard Ferguson, composer and musicologist, 91
11 November – Thomas Pitfield, composer, artist and writer, 96
14 November – Minna Keal, composer, 90
7 December – Kenny Baker, jazz trumpeter, 78

See also
 1999 in British music charts
 1999 in British radio
 1999 in British television
 1999 in the United Kingdom
 List of British films of 1999

References

External links
BBC Radio 1's Chart Show with Mark Goodier
The Official Charts Company

 
British music by year
20th century in music